The 2019–20 Serie D was the seventy-second edition of the top level Italian non-professional football championship. It represents the fourth tier in the Italian football league system.

The season was ended in advance by the Italian Football Federation on 20 May 2020, after a two-month suspension, due to the COVID-19 pandemic in Italy. On 22 May, the Lega Nazionale Dilettanti formally proposed the nine first-placed teams for promotion to Serie C, with the four bottom teams in each group as the ones to be relegated in the Eccellenza league.

Changes from 2018–19 
Following the 2018–19 season which saw the participation of former Serie A teams such as Bari, Modena, Cesena, Avellino and Reggio Audace (all promoted to Serie C after their first season), new legal incarnations of former top flight clubs Palermo (excluded from Serie B due to financial issues) and Foggia took part in the league, under the Article 52 of N.O.I.F. regulation.

Teams 
The composition of the league will involve nine divisions, grouped geographically and named alphabetically.

Teams relegated from Serie C 
None of the teams that were relegated in a normal fashion, by virtue of their finishing positions and unsuccessful playouts in the 2018–19 Serie C season will take part in this campaign.

Cuneo, originally relegated to Serie D, declined to their right to participate in the season, whereas Virtus Verona, Fano, Paganese and Bisceglie were readmitted to Serie C in order to fill various vacancies. Teams returning to Serie D from higher divisions last season as a result of bankruptcy and/or administrative issues include Foggia, Palermo, Lucchese and Arzachena.

Teams promoted from Eccellenza 
Twenty-eight clubs were promoted from the Eccellenza as league winners, plus one as the Coppa Italia Dilettanti winners and seven more as national playoff winners.

Abruzzo
 Chieti
Apulia
 Casarano
 Brindisi
Basilicata
 Grementum Val d'Agri
Calabria
 Corigliano
Campania
 Giugliano
 San Tommaso
Emilia Romagna
 Correggese
 Alfonsine
 Progresso
Friuli Venezia Giulia
 San Luigi
Lazio
 Team Nuova Florida
 Tor Sapienza

Liguria
 Vado
Lombardy
 Castellanzese
 NibionnoOggiono
 Brusaporto
 Breno
 Tritium
Marche
 Tolentino
 Porto Sant'Elpidio
Molise
 Vastogirardi
Piedmont & Aosta Valley
 Verbania
 Fossano
Sardinia
 Muravera

Sicily
 Licata
 Marina di Ragusa
 Biancavilla
Trentino Alto Adige – Südtirol
 Dro
Tuscany
 Grosseto
 Grassina
Umbria
 Foligno
Veneto
 Caldiero
 Vigasio
 Luparense
 Mestre

  As Coppa Italia Dilettanti finalists.
  As national playoff winners.

Repechages 
A number of vacancies are also expected to be created by some clubs failing to register in Serie C and Serie D. The Serie D committee will fill in these vacancies with additional teams to be chosen among the ones relegated from the league in 2018–19, and other ones who played and lost the Eccellenza promotion playoffs; a classification of the clubs who applied for these vacancies was announced on 18 July 2019.

On 31 July 2019, the Lega Nazionale Dilettanti announced to have admitted Agropoli, Legnago Salus, Pomezia, Olympia Agnonese, Legnano, Gladiator, Tamai and Anagni to fill in all the league vacancies.

Previous season's teams not returning 
Rezzato, Francavilla and Gela opted not to register to the Serie D season.

Girone A

League table

Girone B

League table

Girone C

League table

Girone D

League table

Girone E

League table

Girone F

League table

Girone G

League table

Girone H

League table

Girone I

League table

References

4
Serie D seasons
Italy
Italy